629112 Saskatchewan Ltd., trading as Saskatoon Media Group, is a Canadian radio broadcasting company which is based in, and owns three terrestrial radio stations in the city of Saskatoon, Saskatchewan. Its studios were formerly located in downtown Saskatoon; in 2021, it re-located to a newer facility on Robin Crescent in north Saskatoon.

The company is owned by Elmer Hildebrand Communications, Inc. They are part of the holdings of Elmer Hildebrand, which also include Golden West Broadcasting (which is held separately from the Saskatoon stations).

Stations

References

Companies based in Saskatoon
Golden West Broadcasting